Ba Đồn is a ward (phường) in Ba Đồn town, Quảng Bình Province, Vietnam. The township is the district seat and located on National Route 1, about 40 km north of the provincial capital, Đồng Hới. The ward is the commercial and service center serving surrounding rural areas. Ba Đồn, together with some surrounding communes of Quảng Trạch were incorporated into a 3rd municipality (town or thị xã) on December 26, 2013. 

Communes of Quảng Bình province
Populated places in Quảng Bình province